Discoverer 19, also known as RM-1, was an American satellite which was launched in 1960. It was a technology demonstration spacecraft, based on an Agena-B.

The launch of Discoverer 19 occurred at 20:32 UTC on 20 December 1960. A Thor DM-21 Agena-B rocket was used, flying from Launch Complex 75-3-5 at the Vandenberg Air Force Base. Upon successfully reaching orbit, it was assigned the Harvard designation 1960 Tau 1.

Communication with the satellite was lost on Christmas Day 1960. It remained in orbit until 23 January 1961, when it decayed and reentered the atmosphere.

References

Spacecraft launched in 1960
Spacecraft which reentered in 1961